Legs is a fictional character in the  who appeared as a supporting character in various Batman-related comics during the 80s and 90s. Co-created by writers John Wagner and Alan Grant, and artist Norm Breyfogle, he first appeared in Detective Comics #587 (June 1988).

Publication history
Legs was created during Detective Comics debut of Wagner and Grant, co-writers established for their work on Judge Dredd comics for 2000 AD. However, due to poor sales of their comics within months of their debut, which left both men questioning the viability of their new jobs, Wagner soon left the project alone to Grant. Concerned that he would be fired if his editors learned the writing team had split, Grant alerted no one to the change, and decided to continue writing stories in the pattern of the first for the duration of his original contract. Now a regular writer for Detective Comics and other Batman-related titles during this time period, Grant made frequent use of Legs as an ally for the anarchist themed character, Anarky. Legs is shown to be loyal to Anarky as a vigilante, who in turn employs Legs and other homeless men to act as diversions or spies against Batman. As such, the two characters appear together prominently in Batman: Anarky, a trade paperback collection of comics written by Grant.

Legs is characterized as a homeless Vietnam veteran and resident of the streets of Gotham City. Holding strong views, the character is described as being prone to frustration, anger, and alcoholism, and frequently argues with other homeless men. Legs is ironically named for his missing limbs, which he is described as having lost due to an anti-personnel mine explosion in the Vietnam War in Detective Comics #608 (November 1989). Crippled and unable to afford a wheelchair, he is shown to move about in a wheeled tray.

The character has not appeared in published material since the departure of Alan Grant from DC Comics in 2000, and has fallen into obscurity.

See also
1988 in comics
List of Batman supporting characters
List of DC Comics characters

References

External links

Legs on the Unofficial Guide to the DC Universe website.

Characters created by John Wagner
Characters created by Norm Breyfogle
Comics characters introduced in 1988
DC Comics characters
DC Comics military personnel
Fictional amputees
Fictional Vietnam War veterans
Anarky